Blast Theory is a Portslade-based artists' group, whose work mixes interactive media, digital broadcasting and live performance.

Biography

The group was founded in 1991 by Matt Adams, Niki Jewett, Will Kittow and Ju Row Farr. The group is currently led by Matt Adams, Ju Row Farr and Nick Tandavanitj. Other members include the film maker John Hardwick and performer Jamie Iddon. Over its history, Blast Theory's work has explored interactivity and the social and political aspects of technology through a multitude of forms – using performance, installation, video, mobile and online technologies.

Currently based at their studios in Portslade, Blast Theory tours nationally and internationally, working with a number of Associate Artists on different projects. The group has collaborated with The University of Nottingham's Mixed Reality Lab since 1998. Works created collaboratively with the MRL include Desert Rain (1999), Can You See Me Now? (2001) and Rider Spoke (2007).
Blast Theory's work has been shown at NTT InterCommunication Center (ICC) in Tokyo, the Chicago Museum of Contemporary Art, Sydney Biennale, National Museum in Taiwan, Hebbel Theater in Berlin, Basel Art Fair, Dutch Electronic Arts Festival, Sónar Festival in Barcelona, and Palestine International Video Festival. Recent commissions include You Get Me (2008) at the Royal Opera House, Covent Garden, for Deloitte Ignite '08, and Ulrike and Eamon Compliant (2009) for the De La Warr Pavilion at the 53rd Venice Biennale.

In 2015 the group launched Karen, an app that psychologically profiles the user.

Approach
Blast Theory's artists describe their work as collaborative and interdisciplinary. With early works such as Gunmen Kill Three (1991) and Chemical Wedding (1994) fitting more in the category of live and performance art, Desert Rain (1999) saw a shift towards work that aims to question performativity, site and presence.
Works such as Can You See Me Now? (2001), a game of chase through real and virtual city streets, have seen Blast Theory mix video games and performance, with Can You See Me Now? and You Get Me (2008) being open to a worldwide audience via the internet.
Recent work uses mobile technologies such as text messaging, MMS messaging and 3G phones with the aim of "exploring how technology might be considered to create new cultural spaces in which the work is customised and personalised for each participant".

Notable works

2015
Karen

2009
Urike and Eamon Compliant
Flypad

2008
You Get Me

2007
Rider Spoke

2006
Soft Message
Day of the Figurines

2005
Single Story Building, Tate Online

2004
Energy Gallery, The Science Museum
Light Square
I Like Frank

2003
Uncle Roy All Around You

2001
Can You See Me Now? – Installation

2002
Stay Home Read
Single Story Building
TRUCOLD

2001
Viewfinder
Can You See Me Now?
An Explicit Volume

2000
Choreographic Cops in a Complicated World
Sidetracks : Light Sleeper & Body Chemistry IV

1999
Desert Rain
10 Backwards
Route 12:36

1998
Kidnap
Architecture Foundation
Atomic Installation

1997
Safehouse
Invisible Bullets (video)
Atomic Performance
Blipvert
C'mon Baby, Fight! Fight! Fight!
Ultrapure

1996
Something American
Internal Ammunition

1995
The Gilt Remake

1994
Invisible Bullets
Stampede

1992
Chemical Wedding

1991
Gunmen Kill Three

Selected awards

2013 – The BIMA Awards (UK) – Nomination in Games category, I'd Hide You
2013 – The People's Lovie Awards (UK) – Winner in Events and Live Broadcast category for The Lovie Award and The People's Lovie Award, I'd Hide You
2012 – MUSE Awards (US) – Honourable Mention in the Applications & APIs category for Ghostwriter
2011 – Sheffield Doc/Fest Innovation Award (UK) – Nomination, Ulrike and Eamon Compliant
2010 – International Mobile Gaming Awards (Spain) – Winner Best Real World Game, Ulrike and Eamon Compliant
2009 – Brighton and Hove Business Awards (UK) – Winner of Most Awesome Use of Digital Media
2009 – 14th Annual Webby Awards (USA) – Nomination in NetArt category, You Get Me
2009 – IndieCade Festival of Independent Games (USA) – Finalist, You Get Me
2009 – Total Theatre Awards, Edinburgh Festival Fringe (UK) – Nomination in Innovation/Interaction/Immersion category, Rider Spoke
2008 – Winner of The Digital Collaboration Award at DiMA:S
2007 – Honorary Mention, Prix Ars Electronica for Day Of The Figurines
2006 – Winner of The Hospital Award for Interactive Media
2005 – Winner of the Maverick Award, Game Developers Choice Awards, USA
2005 – Interactive Arts BAFTA Award, nominated for Uncle Roy All Around You in two categories: Interactive Arts and Technical & Social Innovation
2004 – Net Art Award, the Webby Awards, nominated for Uncle Roy All Around You
2003 – Winner of the Prix Ars Electronica 'Golden Nica' for Interactive Art for Can You See Me Now?
2003 – VIPER Basel International Award, nominated for Can You See Me Now?
2002 – Interactive Arts BAFTA Award, nominated for Can You See Me Now?
2002 – International Fellowship Award, Arts Council England
2002 – Innovation Award, Arts and Humanities Research Board, awarded for Uncle Roy All Around You
2001 – International Media Art Award, ZKM Centre for Arts and Media, Karlsruhe, nominated for Kidnap
2001 – Transmediale Awards, Berlin, Honorary Mention for Desert Rain
2000 – Interactive Arts BAFTA Award, nominated for Desert Rain
2000 – Breakthrough Award for Innovation, nominated, Arts Council England
1999 – The 18 Creative Freedom Awards, nominated for Kidnap
1996 – Winner of the Barclays New Stages Award, for Something American

Key reading

 Steve Benford, Rob Anastasi, Martin Flintham, Adam Drozd, Andy Crabtree, Chris Greenhalgh, Nick Tandavanitj, Matt Adams, Ju Row-Farr, 'Can You See Me Now?', Pervasive Computing, No.3, Volume 2, July/September 2003, pp. 49–51
 Blast Theory, Desert Rain (A Virtual Reality Game/Installation), 2002, pp.1–36 (Blast Theory, London)
 Dixon, Steve 'Digital Performance, A history of new media in theatre, dance, performance art, and installation', 2007, pp. 616–621 (The MIT Press, Cambridge, UK)
 Giannachi, Gabriella 'About War and Inaction: Blast Theory's Desert Rain', Virtual Theatres: An Introduction, 2004, pp.115–122 (Routledge, London)
 Emma Govan, Helen Nicholson and Katie Normington 'Making a Performance, Devising Histories and Contemporary Practices', 2008, pp. 179 – 187 (Routledge Taylor and Francis Group, London)

References

External links
 
 Arts Council England
 
 
 IPerG – Integrated Project of Pervasive Games
 Mixed Reality Lab, Nottingham

British digital artists
Postmodern artists
English contemporary artists
English artist groups and collectives
Culture in Brighton and Hove
Pervasive games